Achkar is both a given name and a surname. Notable people with the name include:

Given name 
Achkar Marof (1930–1971), Guinean diplomat
Alok Achkar (born 1991), Brazilian Dj

Surname 
Ad Achkar (born 1988), Lebanese photographer
Ghassan Achkar (born 1937), Lebanese politician
Massoud Achkar, Lebanese politician
Paul Achkar (1893–1982), Lebanese Archbishop

See also